The class Mammalia (mammals) is divided into two subclasses based on reproductive techniques: monotremes, which lay eggs, and therians, mammals which give live birth, which has two infraclasses: marsupials (pouched mammals) and placental mammals. See List of monotremes and marsupials, and for the clades and families, see Mammal classification. Classification updated from Wilson and Reeder's Mammal Species of the World: A Taxonomic and Geographic Reference using the Planet' Mammifères website.

Magnorder Atlantogenata

Superorder Afrotheria

Clade Afroinsectiphilia

Order Tubulidentata (aardvarks)

 Family Orycteropodidae
Genus Orycteropus
Aardvark, Orycteropus afer

Clade Afroinsectivora

Order Macroscelidea (elephant shrews)

 Family Macroscelididae
 Genus Elephantulus
 Short-snouted elephant shrew, Elephantulus brachyrhynchus
 Cape elephant shrew, Elephantulus edwardii
 Dusky-footed elephant shrew, Elephantulus fuscipes
 Dusky elephant shrew, Elephantulus fuscus
 Bushveld elephant shrew, Elephantulus intufi
 Eastern rock elephant shrew, Elephantulus myurus
 Karoo rock elephant shrew, Elephantulus pilicaudus
 Somali elephant shrew, Elephantulus revoili
 North African elephant shrew, Elephantulus rozeti
 Rufous elephant shrew, Elephantulus rufescens
 Western rock elephant shrew, Elephantulus rupestris
 Genus Macroscelides
 Namib round-eared sengi, Macroscelides flavicaudatus
 Etendaka round-eared sengi, Macroscelides micus
 Round-eared elephant shrew, Macroscelides proboscideus
 Genus Petrodromus
 Four-toed elephant shrew, Petrodromus tetradactylus
 Genus Rhynchocyon
 Golden-rumped elephant shrew, Rhynchocyon chrysopygus
 Checkered elephant shrew, Rhynchocyon cirnei
 Black and rufous elephant shrew, Rhynchocyon petersi
 Grey-faced sengi, R. udzungwensis

Order Afrosoricida (tenrecs and golden moles)

 Family Tenrecidae (tenrecs)
 Subfamily Geogalinae
 Genus Geogale
 Large-eared tenrec, Geogale aurita
 Subfamily Oryzorictinae
 Genus Limnogale
 Web-footed tenrec, Limnogale mergulus
 Genus Microgale
 Short-tailed shrew tenrec, Microgale brevicaudata
 Cowan's shrew tenrec, Microgale cowani
 Dobson's shrew tenrec, Microgale dobsoni
 Drouhard's shrew tenrec, Microgale drouhardi
 Dryad shrew tenrec, Microgale dryas
 Pale shrew tenrec, Microgale fotsifotsy
 Gracile shrew tenrec, Microgale gracilis
 Naked-nosed shrew tenrec, Microgale gymnorhyncha
 Jenkins' shrew tenrec, Microgale jenkinsae
 Northern shrew tenrec, Microgale jobihely
 Lesser long-tailed shrew tenrec, Microgale longicaudata
 Major's long-tailed tenrec, Microgale majori
 Montane shrew tenrec, Microgale monticola
 Nasolo's shrew tenrec, Microgale nasoloi
 Pygmy shrew tenrec, Microgale parvula
 Greater long-tailed shrew tenrec, Microgale principula
 Least shrew tenrec, Microgale pusilla
 Shrew-toothed shrew tenrec, Microgale soricoides
 Taiva shrew tenrec, Microgale taiva
 Talazac's shrew tenrec, Microgale talazaci
 Thomas's shrew tenrec, Microgale thomasi
 Genus Oryzorictes
 Mole-like rice tenrec, Oryzorictes hova
 Four-toed rice tenrec, Oryzorictes tetradactylus
 Subfamily Potamogalinae
 Genus Micropotamogale
 Nimba otter shrew, Micropotamogale lamottei
 Ruwenzori otter shrew, Micropotamogale ruwenzorii
 Genus Potamogale
 Giant otter shrew, Potamogale velox
 Subfamily Tenrecinae
 Genus Echinops
 Lesser hedgehog tenrec, Echinops telfairi
 Genus Hemicentetes
 Highland streaked tenrec, Hemicentetes nigriceps
 Lowland streaked tenrec, Hemicentetes semispinosus
 Genus Setifer
 Greater hedgehog tenrec, Setifer setosus
 Genus Tenrec
 Tailless tenrec, Tenrec ecaudatus
 Family Chrysochloridae (golden moles)
Subfamily Chrysochlorinae
 Genus Carpitalpa
 Arends' golden mole, Carpitalpa arendsi
 Genus Chlorotalpa
 Duthie's golden mole, Chlorotalpa duthieae
 Sclater's golden mole, Chlorotalpa sclateri
 Genus Chrysochloris
 Cape golden mole, Chrysochloris asiatica
 Visagie's golden mole, Chrysochloris visagiei
 Stuhlmann's golden mole, Chrysochloris stuhlmanni
 Genus Chrysospalax
 Giant golden mole, Chrysospalax trevelyani
 Rough-haired golden mole, Chrysospalax villosus
 Genus Cryptochloris
 De Winton's golden mole, Cryptochloris wintoni
 Van Zyl's golden mole, Cryptochloris zyli
 Genus Eremitalpa
 Grant's golden mole, Eremitalpa granti
Subfamily Amblysominae
 Genus Amblysomus
 Fynbos golden mole, Amblysomus corriae
 Hottentot golden mole, Amblysomus hottentotus
 Marley's golden mole, Amblysomus marleyi
 Robust golden mole, Amblysomus robustus
 Highveld golden mole, Amblysomus septentrionalis
 Genus Calcochloris
 Congo golden mole, Calcochloris leucorhinus
 Yellow golden mole, Calcochloris obtusirostris
 Somali golden mole, Calcochloris tytonis
 Genus Neamblysomus
 Juliana's golden mole, Neamblysomus julianae
 Gunning's golden mole, Neamblysomus gunningi

Clade Paenungulata

Order Hyracoidea (hyraxes)

 Family Procaviidae
 Genus Dendrohyrax
 Southern tree hyrax, Dendrohyrax arboreus
 Western tree hyrax, Dendrohyrax dorsalis
 Genus Heterohyrax
 Yellow-spotted rock hyrax, Heterohyrax brucei
 Genus Procavia 
 Cape hyrax, Procavia capensis

Clade Tethytheria

Order Proboscidea (elephants)

 Family Elephantidae
Genus Loxodonta
African forest elephant, Loxodonta cyclotis
African bush elephant, Loxodonta africana

Genus Elephas
Asian elephant, Elephas maximus

Order Sirenia (dugongs and manatees)

 Family Dugongidae
 Genus Dugong
Dugong, Dugong dugon
 Genus Hydrodamalis
†Steller's sea cow, Hydrodamalis gigas
 Family Trichechidae
Genus Trichechus (manatees)
West Indian manatee, Trichechus manatus
African manatee, Trichechus senegalensis
Amazonian manatee, Trichechus inunguis
Dwarf manatee, Trichecus pygmaeus – validity questionable

Superorder Xenarthra

Order Cingulata (armadillos)
 Family Dasypodidae
 Genus Dasypus
 Nine-banded armadillo, Dasypus novemcinctus
 Seven-banded armadillo, Dasypus septemcinctus
 Southern long-nosed armadillo, Dasypus hybridus
 Llanos long-nosed armadillo, Dasypus sabanicola
 Greater long-nosed armadillo, Dasypus kappleri
 Hairy long-nosed armadillo, Dasypus pilosus
 Yepes's mulita, Dasypus yepesi 
 Family Chlamyphoridae
 Subfamily Chlamyphorinae
 Genus Calyptophractus
 Greater fairy armadillo, Calyptophractus retusus
 Genus Chlamyphorus, Chlamyphorus truncatus
Pink fairy armadillo, Chlamyphorus truncatus
 Subfamily Euphractinae
 Genus Euphractus
Six-banded armadillo, Euphractus sexcinctus
 Genus Zaedyus
Pichi, Zaedyus pichiy 
 Genus Chaetophractus
Screaming hairy armadillo, Chaetophractus vellerosus
Big hairy armadillo, Chaetophractus villosus
Andean hairy armadillo, Chaetophractus nationi
 Subfamily Tolypeutinae
 Genus Cabassous
Greater naked-tailed armadillo, Cabassous tatouay
Chacoan naked-tailed armadillo, Cabassous chacoensis
Northern naked-tailed armadillo, Cabassous centralis
Southern naked-tailed armadillo, Cabassous unicinctus
 Genus Priodontes
Giant armadillo, Priodontes maximus
 Genus Tolypeutes
Southern three-banded armadillo, Tolypeutes matacus
Brazilian three-banded armadillo, Tolypeutes tricinctus

Order Pilosa
10 extant species in 4 families, all in the Americas, comprising anteaters and sloths.

Suborder Vermilingua (anteaters)
 Family Cyclopedidae
 Genus Cyclopes
 Silky anteater, Cyclopes didactylus
 Family Myrmecophagidae
 Genus Myrmecophaga
 Giant anteater, Myrmecophaga tridactyla
 Genus Tamandua
 Northern tamandua, Tamandua mexicana
 Southern tamandua, Tamandua tetradactyla

Suborder Folivora (sloths)
 Family Bradypodidae (three-toed sloths)
 Genus Bradypus
 Pygmy three-toed sloth, Bradypus pygmaeus
 Brown-throated sloth, Bradypus variegatus
 Pale-throated three-toed sloth, Bradypus tridactylus
 Maned three-toed sloth, Bradypus torquatus
 Family Megalonychidae (two-toed sloths)
 Genus Choloepus
 Hoffman's two-toed sloth, Choloepus hoffmanni
 Linnaeus's two-toed sloth, Choloepus didactylus

Magnorder Boreoeutheria

Superorder Euarchontoglires

Grandorder Euarchonta

Mirorder Primatomorpha

Order Scandentia (treeshrews)
There are 20 species placed in five genera; all are from Southeast Asia.
 Family Ptilocercidae
 Genus Ptilocercus
 Pen-tailed treeshrew, Ptilocercus lowii
 Family Tupaiidae
 Genus Anathana
 Madras treeshrew, Anathana ellioti
 Genus Dendrogale
 Bornean smooth-tailed treeshrew, Dendrogale melanura
 Northern smooth-tailed treeshrew, Dendrogale murina
 Genus Tupaia
 Northern treeshrew, Tupaia belangeri
 Golden-bellied treeshrew, Tupaia chrysogaster
 Striped treeshrew, Tupaia dorsalis
 Common treeshrew, Tupaia glis
 Slender treeshrew, Tupaia gracilis
 Horsfield's treeshrew, Tupaia javanica
 Long-footed treeshrew, Tupaia longipes
 Pygmy treeshrew, Tupaia minor
 Calamian treeshrew, Tupaia moellendorffi
 Mountain treeshrew, Tupaia montana
 Nicobar treeshrew, Tupaia nicobarica
 Palawan treeshrew, Tupaia palawanensis
 Painted treeshrew, Tupaia picta
 Ruddy treeshrew, Tupaia splendidula
 Large treeshrew, Tupaia tana
 Genus Urogale
 Mindanao treeshrew, Urogale everetti

Order Dermoptera (colugos)

 Family Cynocephalidae
 Genus Cynocephalus
 Philippine flying lemur, Cynocephalus volans
 Genus Galeopterus
Sunda flying lemur, Galeopterus variegatus

Order Primates

Grandorder Glires

Order Rodentia

Order Lagomorpha

Superorder Laurasiatheria

Order Eulipotyphla
 Family Solenodontidae
 Genus Solenodon
 †Giant solenodon, Solenodon arredondoi
 †Marcano's solenodon, Solenodon marcanoi
 Cuban solenodon, Solenodon cubanus
 Hispaniolan solenodon, Solenodon paradoxus
 Family Talpidae
 Subfamily Uropsilinae (shrewmoles)
 Genus Uropsilus
Anderson's shrew mole, Uropsilus andersoni
Gracile shrew mole, Uropsilus gracilis
Inquisitive shrew mole, Uropsilus investigator
Chinese shrew mole, Uropsilus soricipes
 Subfamily Neurotrichinae (American shrew mole)
 Genus Neurotrichus
 American shrew mole, Neurotrichus gibbsii
 Subfamily Desmaninae (diving moles)
 Genus Desmana
 Russian desman, Desmana moschata
 Genus Galemys
 Pyrenean desman, Galemys pyrenaicus
 Subfamily Talpinae
 Tribe Talpini
 Genus Euroscaptor
Greater Chinese mole, Euroscaptor grandis
Kloss's mole, Euroscaptor klossi
Long-nosed mole, Euroscaptor longirostris
Malaysian mole, Euroscaptor malayana
Himalayan mole, Euroscaptor micrura
Japanese mountain mole, Euroscaptor mizura
Small-toothed mole, Euroscaptor parvidens
 Euroscaptor subanura
 Genus Mogera
Echigo mole, Mogera etigo
Insular mole, Mogera insularis
Kano mole, Mogera kanoana
Kobe mole, Mogera kobeae
Small Japanese mole, Mogera imaizumii
Large mole, Mogera robusta
Sado mole, Mogera tokudae
Japanese mole, Mogera wogura
Senkaku mole, Mogera uchidai
 Genus Parascaptor
White-tailed mole, Parascaptor leucura
 Genus Scaptochirus
Short-faced mole, Scaptochirus moschatus
 Genus Talpa
Altai mole, Talpa altaica
Blind mole, Talpa caeca
Caucasian mole, Talpa caucasica
European mole, Talpa europaea
Père David's mole, Talpa davidiana
Levant mole, Talpa levantis
Spanish mole, Talpa occidentalis
Roman mole, Talpa romana
Balkan mole, Talpa stankovici
 Tribe Condylurini
 Genus Condylura
Star-nosed mole, Condylura cristata
 Tribe Scalopini
 Genus Parascalops
Hairy-tailed mole, Parascalops breweri
 Genus Scalopus
Eastern mole (common mole), Scalopus aquaticus
 Genus Scapanulus
Gansu mole, Scapanulus oweni
 Genus Scapanus (western North American moles)
Anthony's Mexican mole, Scapanus anthonyi
Northern broad-footed mole (Scapanus latimanus)
Southern broad-footed mole (Scapanus occultus)
Coast mole, Scapanus orarius
Townsend's mole, Scapanus townsendii
 Tribe Scaptonychini
 Genus Scaptonyx
 Long-tailed mole, Scaptonyx fusicaudus
 Tribe Urotrichini
 Genus Dymecodon
 True's shrew mole, Dymecodon pilirostris
 Genus Urotrichus
 Japanese shrew mole, Urotrichus talpoides
 Family Erinaceidae
 Subfamily Erinaceinae (hedgehogs) 
 Genus Atelerix
 Four-toed hedgehog, Atelerix albiventris
 North African hedgehog, Atelerix algirus
 Southern African hedgehog, Atelerix frontalis
 Somali hedgehog, Atelerix sclateri
 Genus Erinaceus
 Amur hedgehog, Erinaceus amurensis
 Southern white-breasted hedgehog, Erinaceus concolor
 European hedgehog, Erinaceus europaeus
 Northern white-breasted hedgehog, Erinaceus roumanicus
 Genus Hemiechinus
 Long-eared hedgehog, Hemiechinus auritus
 Indian long-eared hedgehog, Hemiechinus collaris
 Genus Mesechinus
 Daurian hedgehog, Mesechinus dauuricus
 Hugh's hedgehog, Mesechinus hughi
 Genus Paraechinus
 Desert hedgehog, Paraechinus aethiopicus
 Brandt's hedgehog, Paraechinus hypomelas
 Indian hedgehog, Paraechinus micropus 
 Bare-bellied hedgehog, Paraechinus nudiventris
 Subfamily Galericinae (gymnures or moonrats)
 Genus Echinosorex
 Greater moonrat, Echinosorex gymnura
 Genus Hylomys
 Long-eared gymnure, Hylomys megalotis
 Dwarf gymnure, Hylomys parvus
 Short-tailed gymnure or lesser moonrat, Hylomys suillus
 Genus Neohylomys
 Family Soricidae (shrews)

Clade Ferungulata

Order Chiroptera (bats)

Order Pholidota (pangolins)

 Family Manidae
 Genus Manis
 Indian pangolin, Manis crassicaudata
 Chinese pangolin, Manis pentadactyla
 Asian giant pangolin, Manis paleojavanica †
 Sunda pangolin, Manis javanica
 Philippine pangolin, Manis culionensis
 Genus Phataginus
 Tree pangolin, Phataginus tricuspis
 Long-tailed pangolin, Phataginus tetradactyla
 Genus Smutsia 
 Giant pangolin, Smutsia gigantea
 Ground pangolin, Smutsia temmincki

Order Cetacea

Order Carnivora

Order Perissodactyla (odd-toed ungulates)

Known as odd-toed ungulates, their rear hooves consist of an odd number of toes.

Suborder Hippomorpha
 Family Equidae (horses and allies)
 Equus ferus
 African wild ass, Equus africanus
 Onager or Asiatic ass, Equus hemionus
 Kiang or Tibetan wild ass, Equus kiang
 Plains zebra, Equus quagga
 Mountain zebra, Equus zebra
 Grevy's zebra, Equus grevyi

Suborder Ceratomorpha
 Family Tapiridae (tapirs)
Genus Tapirus
 Brazilian tapir, Tapirus terrestris
 Mountain tapir, Tapirus pinchaque
 Baird's tapir, Tapirus bairdii
 Malayan tapir, Tapirus indicus
 Kabomani tapir, Tapirus kabomani
 Family Rhinocerotidae (rhinoceroses)
 Genus Diceros
 Black rhinoceros, Diceros bicornis
 Sumatran rhinoceros, Dicerorhinus sumatrensis
 Genus Ceratotherium
 White rhinoceros, Ceratotherium simum
 Genus Rhinoceros
 Indian rhinoceros, Rhinoceros unicornis
 Javan rhinoceros, Rhinoceros sondaicus

Order Artiodactyla (even-toed ungulates)

See also
Mammal classification
List of prehistoric mammals
List of recently extinct mammals
List of monotremes and marsupials

References

 
Taxonomic lists